In geometry, a generalized quadrangle is an incidence structure whose main feature is the lack of any triangles (yet containing many quadrangles). A generalized quadrangle is by definition a polar space of rank two. They are also precisely the partial geometries  pg(s,t,α) with α = 1.

Definition

A generalized quadrangle is an incidence structure (P,B,I), with I ⊆ P × B an incidence relation, satisfying certain axioms.  Elements of P are by definition the points of the generalized quadrangle, elements of B the lines. The axioms are the following:
 There is an s (s ≥ 1) such that on every line there are exactly s + 1 points.  There is at most one point on two distinct lines.
 There is a t (t ≥ 1) such that through every point there are exactly t + 1 lines.  There is at most one line through two distinct points.
 For every point p not on a line L, there is a unique line M and a unique point q, such that p is on M, and q on M and L.

(s,t) are the parameters of the generalized quadrangle. The parameters are allowed to be infinite. If either s or t is one, the generalized quadrangle is called trivial. For example, the 3x3 grid with P = {1,2,3,4,5,6,7,8,9} and B = {123, 456, 789, 147, 258, 369} is a trivial GQ with s = 2 and t = 1. A generalized quadrangle with parameters (s,t) is often denoted by GQ(s,t).

The smallest non-trivial generalized quadrangle is GQ(2,2), whose representation has been dubbed "the doily" by Stan Payne in 1973.

Properties

Graphs

There are two interesting graphs that can be obtained from a generalized quadrangle. 
 The collinearity graph having as vertices the points of a generalized quadrangle, with the collinear points connected. This graph is a strongly regular graph with parameters ((s+1)(st+1), s(t+1), s-1, t+1) where (s,t) is the order of the GQ.
 The incidence graph whose vertices are the points and lines of the generalized quadrangle and two vertices are adjacent if one is a point, the other a line and the point lies on the line. The incidence graph of a generalized quadrangle is characterized by being a connected, bipartite graph with diameter four and girth eight. Therefore, it is an example of a Cage. Incidence graphs of configurations are today generally called Levi graphs, but the original Levi graph was the incidence graph of the GQ(2,2).

Duality

If (P,B,I) is a generalized quadrangle with parameters (s,t), then (B,P,I−1), with I−1 the inverse incidence relation, is also a generalized quadrangle.  This is the dual generalized quadrangle.  Its parameters are (t,s).  Even if s = t, the dual structure need not be isomorphic with the original structure.

Generalized quadrangles with lines of size 3 
There are precisely five (possible degenerate) generalized quadrangles where each line has three points incident with it, the quadrangle with empty line set, the quadrangle with all lines through a fixed point corresponding to the windmill graph Wd(3,n), grid of size 3x3, the GQ(2,2) quadrangle and the unique GQ(2,4). These five quadrangles corresponds to the five root systems in the ADE classes An, Dn, E6, E7 and E8 , i.e., the simply laced root systems. See  and.

Classical generalized quadrangles
When looking at the different cases for polar spaces of rank at least three, and extrapolating them to rank 2, one finds these (finite) generalized quadrangles :

 A hyperbolic quadric , a parabolic quadric  and an elliptic quadric  are the only possible quadrics in projective spaces over finite fields with projective index 1.  We find these parameters respectively :
     (this is just a grid)
  
  
 A hermitian variety  has projective index 1 if and only if n is 3 or 4.  We find :
 
 
 A symplectic polarity in  has a maximal isotropic subspace of dimension 1 if and only if .

Non-classical examples

This is a (q-1,q+1)-generalized quadrangle.
Choose an arbitrary point p and define . The incidence is again the natural one. We obtain once again a (q-1,q+1)-generalized quadrangle

Restrictions on parameters

By using grids and dual grids, any integer z, z ≥ 1 allows generalized quadrangles with parameters (1,z) and (z,1). Apart from that, only the following parameters have been found possible until now, with q an arbitrary prime power :

 
  and  
  and 
  and

References

 S. E. Payne and J. A. Thas. Finite generalized quadrangles. Research Notes in Mathematics, 110. Pitman (Advanced Publishing Program), Boston, MA, 1984. vi+312 pp. , link http://cage.ugent.be/~bamberg/FGQ.pdf

Incidence geometry
Families of sets